Smolyan Point (Nos Smolyan \'nos 'smo-lyan\) is located on the north-western coast of South Bay, Livingston Island in the South Shetland Islands, Antarctica forming the northwest side of the entrance to Emona Anchorage. The ice-covered point shows conspicuous radial crevasses spreading inland and ends up with a 25 m wide and 4 m high rock.  The feature was formed as a result of Pimpirev Glacier's retreat in the late 20th century.

Smolyan is the name of a town in the Rhodope Mountains in southern Bulgaria.

Location
(Bulgarian mapping in 1996, 2005 and 2009 from a 1995/96 Bulgarian topographic survey).

Maps
 L.L. Ivanov. Livingston Island: Central-Eastern Region. Scale 1:25000 topographic map.  Sofia: Antarctic Place-names Commission of Bulgaria, 1996.
 L.L. Ivanov et al. Antarctica: Livingston Island and Greenwich Island, South Shetland Islands. Scale 1:100000 topographic map. Sofia: Antarctic Place-names Commission of Bulgaria, 2005.
 L.L. Ivanov. Antarctica: Livingston Island and Greenwich, Robert, Snow and Smith Islands. Scale 1:120000 topographic map.  Troyan: Manfred Wörner Foundation, 2009.

References
 Smolyan Point. SCAR Composite Antarctic Gazetteer
 Bulgarian Antarctic Gazetteer. Antarctic Place-names Commission. (details in Bulgarian, basic data in English)

External links
 Smolyan Point. Copernix satellite image

Headlands of Livingston Island